The men's road race competition at the 1998 Asian Games was held on 19 December.

Schedule
All times are Indochina Time (UTC+07:00)

Results 
Legend
DNF — Did not finish

References

External links 
Results

Road Men